Harvard University is undergoing a major expansion in Allston, Massachusetts.  The Harvard Business School and many of the university's athletics facilities, including Harvard Stadium, are located on a  campus in Allston, a Boston neighborhood across the Charles River from the Cambridge campus. The John W. Weeks Bridge, a pedestrian bridge over the Charles River, connects the two campuses.
Intending a major expansion, Harvard now owns more land in Allston than it does in Cambridge. A ten-year plan calls for 1.4 million square feet (130,000 square meters) of new construction and 500,000 square feet (50,000 square meters) of renovations, including new and renovated buildings at Harvard Business School; a hotel and conference center; a multipurpose institutional building; renovations to graduate student housing and to Harvard Stadium; new athletic facilities; new laboratories and classrooms for the John A. Paulson School of Engineering and Applied Sciences; expansion of the Harvard Education Portal; and a district energy facility.

Sources

Harvard University